Morgan City is the name of some places in the United States of America:

Morgan City, Alabama
Morgan City, Louisiana
Morgan City, Mississippi

Ship
 Morgan City (US Navy) was a US Navy transport, which sank off Kobe in 1899.